Limenandra is a genus of marine nudibranch in the family Aeolidiidae.

Species
Species in the genus Limenandra include:
 Limenandra barnosii Carmona, Pola, Gosliner & Cervera, 2014
 Limenandra confusa Carmona, Pola, Gosliner & Cervera, 2014
 Limenandra fusiformis (Baba, 1949)
 Limenandra nodosa Haefelfinger & Stamm, 1958
 Limenandra rosanae Carmona, Pola, Gosliner & Cervera, 2014

References

External links

Aeolidiidae